In geology, clay-with-flints was the name given by William Whitaker in 1861 to a peculiar deposit of stiff red, brown or yellow clay containing unworn whole flints as well as angular shattered fragments, also with a variable admixture of rounded flint, quartz, quartzite and other pebbles.

Occurrence

The Formation is associated with deposits of the Chalk Group, subsequent Palaeogene and Neogene strata, and occasionally Upper Greensand. It occurs in sheets or patches of various sizes over a large area in the south of England, from Hertfordshire on the north to Sussex on the south, and from Kent on the east to Devon on the west. It almost always lies on the surface of the Upper Chalk, but in Dorset it passes on to the Middle and Lower Chalk, and in Devon it is found on the Chert-Beds of the Selbornian group.

Origin

The formation is now considered to be a combination of residual and cryoturbated strata, and to be of a variety of ages.

References

External links
Clay-with-Flints in the British Geological Survey lexicon.

Geology of England
Geology of Northern Ireland
Sediments
Geologic formations of the United Kingdom